Franz Kirms (21 December 1750 – 3 May 1826) was the official comrade of Johann Wolfgang von Goethe in the management of the Weimar Theatre and as a flower lover.

Life 
Kirms came from a family of civil servants who lived since 1701 in a house built around 1520 in Jakobstraße 10. He was a tax official from 1789 and from 1814 Privy Councillor in Weimar. Duke Karl August, Grand Duke of Saxe-Weimar-Eisenach entrusted him with the supervision of the Hofmarschall- and Stallamt. Besides, Kirms was a passionate flower lover to whom Duke Carl August handed over rare plants from his travels for breeding.

Since 1791 he supported Goethe at the Theaterintendanz. He was in charge of the actual business administration of the Weimar Theatre, which he led very skilfully and energetically after Goethe's retirement together with Count Albert Cajetan von Edling until his death. In 1808 the theater laws were published. Goethe valued highly his performance.

On 27 December 1823, at the age of 73, Kirms married the forty-two year old Erdmuthe Sophie, called Caroline, Krackow (1779-1866), who since 1804 was the partner of the hereditary great duchess Maria Pawlowna, the tsar's daughter and wife of the hereditary duke. The marriage remained childless.

Kims died in Weimar at the age of 75.

The burial place of the Kirms-Krackow family is located on the historical cemetery in Weimar.

Appreciation 
In a conversation with Chancellor Friedrich von Müller and Friedrich Soret on 16 March 1824, Goethe paid tribute to Franz Kirms in connection with his departure from the Theaterintendanz with the following words:

Further reading 
 Geschichte über das Haus Kirms und Franz Kirms als PDF-Download critical remarks on the curatorial concept of the exhibition (54 kB)
 Hans Wahl, Anton Kippenberg: Goethe und seine Welt, Insel-Verlag, Leipzig 1932

References

External links 
 Über den Blumenfreund und das Haus Kirms in Weimar
 Suchergebnisse über Franz Kirms bei Zeno.org

German theatre directors
1750 births
1826 deaths
Place of birth missing